Japanese customs may refer to:
The Japanese customs service
Etiquette in Japan